Mohamed Qotb Abou Gabal Ali (born 29 January 1989), also known as Gabaski, is an Egyptian professional footballer who plays as a goalkeeper for Egyptian Premier League club National Bank of Egypt and the Egypt national team.

Club career 
Abou Gabal played for ENPPI, Smouha and Zamalek. He was nicknamed "Gabaski" by Jesualdo Ferreira in 2015. In September 2022, he joined National Bank of Egypt on free transfer.

International career 
On 3 September 2011, Gabaski made his debut for the Egypt national football team in a 2–1 away defeat by Sierra Leone, in the 2012 Africa Cup of Nations qualification. He didn't make another appearance for Egypt until 10 years later, on 30 September 2021, when he came on as a substitute in the 68th minute in a friendly 2–0 home win against Liberia. Less than two weeks later, on 11 October, he made his third appearance for Egypt coming on as a substitute in the 26th minute in a 3–0 away win against Libya in the 2022 FIFA World Cup qualification.

Gabaski was included in the Egypt squad for the 2021 Africa Cup of Nations (held in 2022). He was brought on as a substitute in Egypt's round of 16 clash with Ivory Coast. He saved Eric Bailly's penalty, helping Egypt advance. In the quarterfinal against Morocco, Gabaski started the match before being substituted in extra time due to injury. He returned to the starting line-up in the semi-final against hosts Cameroon. The match ended in a 0–0 draw after extra-time; in the ensuing shootout, Gabaski saved 2 penalties, helping Egypt reach the final. Gabaski then started in the 2021 Africa Cup of Nations Final, where he saved Sadio Mané's penalty and produced a number of impressive saves to keep the game at 0–0 after the end of extra-time. He went on to save another penalty in the subsequent shootout, from Bouna Sarr, but saw teammates Mohamed Abdelmonem and Mohanad Lasheen miss their spot-kicks as Egypt lost 4–2. Nevertheless, he was elected as Man of the Match.

Career statistics

Club

International

Personal life 
On 8 April 2021, Gabaski married Algerian model Samara Yahia who is the 2019 Miss Arab World.

Honours
ENPPI
Egypt Cup: 2010–11

Zamalek
Egyptian Premier League: 2014–15, 2020–21, 2021-22
Egypt Cup: 2014, 2015, 2018–19 , 2021
Egyptian Super Cup: 2019–20
CAF Super Cup: 2020
Egypt

 Africa Cup of Nations runner-up: 2021

References

External links

1989 births
Living people
People from Asyut
Egyptian footballers
Egypt international footballers
Association football goalkeepers
Egypt youth international footballers
Egyptian Premier League players
ENPPI SC players
Zamalek SC players
Smouha SC players
2021 Africa Cup of Nations players